Park Sung-hoon is a Korean name consisting of the family name Park and the given name Sung-hoon, and may refer to:

 Park Sung-hoon (actor) (born 1985), South Korean actor
 Park Sung-hoon (singer) (born 2002), South Korean singer, former figure skater